Events from the year 1770 in Sweden

Incumbents
 Monarch – Adolf Frederick

Events

 
 
 
 August - The Aurora Society is created in the Swedish province of Finland. 
 
 8 November – Crown Prince Gustav and his youngest brother travel to Paris.

Births

 
 
 
 3 March - Johan Wilhelm Palmstruch, naturalist  (died 1811) 
 27 March - Anna Lisa Jermen, entrepreneur (died 1799) 
 27 March - Eleonora Charlotta d'Albedyhll, poet and salonnière (died 1835) 
 9 October - Eleonora Säfström, actress (died 1857) 
 23 October - Lisette Stenberg, actress and pianist (died 1847)
 Carl Dahlén, ballet dancer (died 1851)

Deaths

 
 24 June - Martin van Meytens, painter (born 1695) 
 21 July – Charlotta Frölich, writer, historian and agronomist  (born 1698)

References

External links

 
Years of the 18th century in Sweden